Out to Lunch may refer to:

Out to Lunch!, a 1964 album by Eric Dolphy
Out to Lunch (album), a 1994 album by Mainesthai
Out to Lunch (TV program), a 1974 ABC special
Out to Lunch (video game), a multi-platform action video game created by Mindscape
"Out to Lunch", a poem in the Conductors of Chaos poetry anthology
"Out To Lunch", a song by Krokus from The Blitz
"Out to Lunch", a column by South African writer David Bullard

See also
"Along Comes Mary", a song by The Association which famously has the phrase in its chorus